Adelaide Co of Jehovah's Witnesses Inc v Commonwealth was a court case decided in the High Court of Australia on 14 June 1943.

In January 1941, acting pursuant to the National Security (Subversive Organisations) Regulations 1940, the Government of Australia declared Jehovah's Witnesses to be "prejudicial to the defence of the Commonwealth" and to the "efficient prosecution of the war". Police immediately occupied premises of the organisation.

In September 1941, Jehovah's Witnesses applied to the High Court for an injunction to restrain the Commonwealth from further trespassing on their premises, and seeking damages. The Witnesses argued that the regulations contravened the express constitutional protections for freedom from religious discrimination contained in section 116 of the Australian Constitution, which states:

The court unanimously held that the National Security (Subversive Organisations) Regulations 1940 did not infringe against section 116, but that the government had exceeded the scope of the Commonwealth's "defence power" in section 51(vi) of the Constitution.

This was only the second case to consider section 116. The first had been Krygger v Williams. In that case, the protections afforded by section 116 had been defined very narrowly.

See also

 Australian constitutional law

References

High Court of Australia cases
Australian constitutional law
Rights in the Australian Constitution cases
Defence power in the Australian Constitution cases
1943 in Australian law
Jehovah's Witnesses litigation
1943 in case law
History of Adelaide
Christianity and law in the 20th century
Law about religion in Australia
20th century in Adelaide